The flag of Alderney was granted on 20 December 1993. The flag is composed of St George's Cross with Alderney's coat of arms in the centre, and a lion holding a sprig on a green background with a golden border.

See also
 Flag of Guernsey
 List of flags of the United Kingdom

External links
 

Flag
Flags with crosses
Flags introduced in 1993
Alderney
Flags displaying animals

de:Flagge Guernseys#Flaggen der Inseln